Mega Bank Nepal Limited was an ‘A’ class commercial bank licensed by Nepal Rastra Bank and had branches all across the nation with its head office in Kathmandu which provides entire commercial banking services.

The bank's shares were publicly traded as an 'A' category company in the Nepal Stock Exchange under the ticker symbol MEGA.It merges with Nepal Investment Bank to form Nepal Investment Mega Bank. This new bank started joint operation from January 11,2023.

Network 
Before merger, the bank has 208 branches, 25 extension counter and 146 ATMs throughout Nepal. The bank also has 60 branchless banking centers and more than 2300 remit agents.

External links
 Official website

See also

 List of banks in Nepal
 Commercial Banks of Nepal

References

Banks of Nepal
2010 establishments in Nepal